Stanley Pierre du Preez (born 1 January 1969) is a South African former first-class cricketer.

du Preez was born at Port Elizabeth in January 1969. He later studied in England as a Rhodes Scholar at Magdalen College, Oxford. While studying at Oxford, he played first-class cricket for Oxford University in 1996, making ten appearances. Playing as a left-arm medium-fast bowler, he took 5 wickets from 168 overs at the high average of 126.80, with best figures of 2 for 44. du Preez had the honour of taking the first wicket to fall in the 1996 English cricket season. In addition to playing cricket for Oxford, du Preez also represented the university in rugby union.

References

External links

1969 births
Living people
People from Port Elizabeth
Alumni of Keble College, Oxford
South African cricketers
Oxford University cricketers
Oxford University RFC players